Nizhnyaya Buzinovka is a rural locality (a khutor) in Verkhnebuzinovskoye Rural Settlement, Kletsky District, Volgograd Oblast, Russia. The population was 65 as of 2010.

Geography 
Nizhnyaya Buzinovka is located in steppe on the Liska River, 48 km southeast of Kletskaya (the district's administrative centre) by road. Verkhnyaya Buzinovka is the nearest rural locality.

References 

Rural localities in Kletsky District